East Riding may refer to:

East Riding of Yorkshire, England
East Riding, York Shire (Province of New York) (1664-1683)
East Riding of County Cork, Ireland
East Riding of County Galway, Ireland